The 1940 United States House of Representatives elections in South Carolina were held on November 5, 1940 to select six Representatives for two-year terms from the state of South Carolina.  All five incumbents who ran were re-elected and the open seat in the 1st congressional district was retained by the Democrats.  The composition of the state delegation thus remained solely Democratic.

1st congressional district
Incumbent Democratic Congresswoman Clara G. McMillan of the 1st congressional district succeeded her husband, Thomas S. McMillan, in office upon his death in 1939.  She did not seek re-election and L. Mendel Rivers defeated Alfred von Kolnitz in the Democratic primary and Republican Mrs. John E. Messervy in the general election.

Democratic primary

General election results

|-
| 
| colspan=5 |Democratic hold
|-

2nd congressional district
Incumbent Democratic Congressman Hampton P. Fulmer of the 2nd congressional district, in office since 1921, defeated former Lieutenant Governor Andrew J. Bethea in the Democratic primary and Republican M.B. Cross in the general election.

Democratic primary

General election results

|-
| 
| colspan=5 |Democratic hold
|-

3rd congressional district
Incumbent Democratic Congressman Butler B. Hare of the 3rd congressional district, in office since 1939, defeated former Representative John C. Taylor in the Democratic primary and Republican A.F. Ernest in the general election.

Democratic primary

General election results

|-
| 
| colspan=5 |Democratic hold
|-

4th congressional district
Incumbent Democratic Congressman Joseph R. Bryson of the 4th congressional district, in office since 1939, defeated Virgil Evans in the Democratic primary and Republican J.D. McCullough in the general election.

Democratic primary

General election results

|-
| 
| colspan=5 |Democratic hold
|-

5th congressional district
Incumbent Democratic Congressman James P. Richards of the 5th congressional district, in office since 1933, defeated Roy C. Cobb in the Democratic primary and Republican C.F. Pendleton in the general election.

Democratic primary

General election results

|-
| 
| colspan=5 |Democratic hold
|-

6th congressional district
Incumbent Democratic Congressman John L. McMillan of the 6th congressional district, in office since 1939, defeated James P. "Spot" Mozingo in the Democratic primary and Republican C.B. Ruffin in the general election.

Democratic primary

General election results

|-
| 
| colspan=5 |Democratic hold
|-

See also
United States House of Representatives elections, 1940
South Carolina's congressional districts

References

"Supplemental Report of the Secretary of State to the General Assembly of South Carolina." Report of the State Officers Boards and Committees to the General Assembly of the State of South Carolina. Volume I. Columbia, SC: 1941, pp. 7–9.

South Carolina
United States House of Representatives
1940